Sri Tirupatamma Katha is a 1963 Indian Telugu-language biographical film, based on the life of Penuganchiprolu Tirupatamma, produced by Donepoodi Krishna Murthy under the Gokul Productions banner and directed by B. S. Narayana. It stars N. T. Rama Rao and Krishna Kumari, with music composed by Pamarthi.

Plot 
The film begins approximately 200 years ago, in a village Gopineni Paalem Andhra Pradesh where a couple, Kolla Sivaramayya & Rangamma are blessed with a baby girl Tirupatamma with the grace of Lord Venkateshwara (Ramakrishna). Years roll by, and Tirupatamma (Krishna Kumari) grows as an ardent devotee of Lord Venkateswara. Once, her maternal uncle's son Gopaiah (N. T. Rama Rao) visits and falls for her. Despite, the refusal of his mother Venkamma (Suryakantham) and sister-in-law Chandramma (Hemalatha) Gopaiah couples up with her by virtue of brother Mallaiah (Gummadi). Soon after, Tirupatamma faces severe hardships and never even gets time for her husband. Hence, frustrated Gopaiah is infatuated with a Deva Daasi Padmavathi (Rajasulochana). Be cognizant of it, Mallaiah stops funding him. So, he heists the jewelry of his wife for which Tirupatamma is convicted, thus, viragos torment enhances. Behold of it, Mallaiah decides to retrieve his brother when he implores Padmavathi which she denies. Thereupon, forcibly vacates her when Gopaiah obstructs and Padmavathi pleads to move out. After reaching home when Venkamma & Chandramma denounces Tirupatamma and makes him suspect her chastity. Immediately, enraged Gopaiah stabs Tirupatamma. Suddenly, a flame erupts whereby, Venkamma is burned and Chandramma loses her eyesight when they reveal the truth. Right now, Tirupatamma heals them with her devotional power and breathes last. Eventually, repentant Gopaiah follows her by self-inflicting. At last, Lord Venkateswara appears and claims that Tirupatamma is born to affirm that wife & husband are inseparable both in life & death. Finally, Tirupatamma is adored as a deity at Penuganchiprolu temple today.

Cast 
N. T. Rama Rao as Gopalanna
Krishna Kumari as Tirupatamma
Gummadi as Mallaiah
Mikkilineni as Subbaiah
Ramana Reddy as Joogulu
Satyanarayana
Ramakrishna as Lord Venkateswara
Vangara as Priest
Chadalavada as Shankaraiah
Suryakantham as Venkamma
Chaya Devi as Lokamma
Rajasulochana as Padmavathi
Hemalatha as Chandramma
Surabhi Balasaraswathi as Kaamulu

Soundtrack 

The soundtrack was composed by Pamarthi.

References

External links 
 

1960s Telugu-language films